Alexander Antonovich Mashkevich (also transliterated Alexandr Mashkevic; ; born 23 February 1954) is an Israeli-Kazakh businessman and investor who has major holdings and close political relationships in Kazakhstan. He holds both Kazakh and Israeli citizenship.

He enriched himself in the aftermath of the collapse of the Soviet Union, as he, Patokh Chodiev, and Alijan Ibragimov, obtained mineral and gas operations when they were privatized in Kazakhstan. They founded the company Eurasian Natural Resources Corp.

Biography
Mashkevich was born in Frunze, Kyrgyz SSR, Soviet Union, in 1954. His father Anton, a doctor born in Lithuania, and his mother, Rakhel Yoffe, a lawyer born in Vitebsk, were evacuated to Kyrgyzstan in 1941. His family background is Lithuanian Jewish. He is a graduate of Kyrgyz State University where he studied philology. Mashkevich started out on an academic career, but became a businessman during perestroika.

Mashkevich served as president of the Euro-Asian Jewish Congress (EAJC) until 2011. The EAJC is one of the five regional branches of World Jewish Congress (WJC). He is also a major donor to the Israel lobby group European Friends of Israel.

In 2002, in apparent consultation with Israeli Defense Minister Binyamin Ben-Eliezer, Mashkevich asked his Kazakh President Nursultan Nazarbayev — a personal friend — to intervene with Iran concerning Israeli soldiers captured by Hizbullah.

Career

Mashkevich, Patokh Chodiev, and Alijan Ibragimov form "the Trio", a group of Kazakh businessmen who became billionaires. The Trio gained control of the recently privatized chromium, alumina, and gas operations in Kazakhstan (among the largest in the world).

Mashkevich is a major shareholder in Eurasian National Resources Corporation (ENRC), now one of the world's leading natural resources groups. ENRC, based in London, operates a number of metals assets in Kazakhstan and Africa, having acquired numerous mining operations in Eastern Europe and Africa. In 2009, ENRC generated a $1,462 million profit on sales of $3.8 billion. ENRC was floated on the London Stock Exchange in December 2007, with a market capitalisation on Admission of approximately £6.8 billion. In 2013, ENRC was privatized to form the Eurasian Resources Group.

Mashkevich is one of the owners of London-based Alferon Management, which has acquired mining operations in Zambia, the Democratic Republic of Congo, Indonesia, Kosovo, Russia, and other countries.

In 2019 he was on the Forbes list of billionaires, with a worth of $2.4 billion.

On April 6, 2011, Mashkevitch announced his intention to found a Jewish version of Al-Jazeera.

References

External links 

 Forbes listing of Mashkevich

1954 births
Living people
People from Bishkek
Israeli billionaires
Israeli businesspeople
Israeli investors
Israeli Jews
Israeli people of Lithuanian-Jewish descent
Soviet Jews
Kyrgyzstani Jews
Kazakhstani emigrants to Israel
Kazakhstani Jews
Eurasian Natural Resources Corporation
Kazakhstani billionaires
Israeli people of Belarusian-Jewish descent
Kazakhstani people of Belarusian descent